Frank McRae (March 18, 1941 – April 29, 2021) was an American film and television actor, and a professional football player.

Early life
McRae was born in Memphis, Tennessee. He graduated from Tennessee State University with a double major in drama and history. He was a defensive tackle for the Chicago Bears in the 1967 NFL season appearing in 6 games.

Career
Among his acting roles are bank robber Reed Youngblood in Dillinger (1973); a shouting police captain in 48 Hrs. (1982), a role he later parodied in Last Action Hero (1993) and Loaded Weapon 1 (1993); the history teacher, Mr. Teasdale, in Red Dawn (1984); James Bond's friend Sharkey in Licence to Kill (1989); and former professional boxing champion Harry Noble in Batteries Not Included (1987). He also appeared opposite Sylvester Stallone in 4 films: F.I.S.T. (1978), Paradise Alley (1978), Rocky II (1979), and Lock Up (1989), as well as a protective trucker in The Wizard (1989).

He made an effective pairing with John Candy as two bumbling subordinates; first as two tank soldiers (under an equally bumbling Sgt. Frank Tree played by Dan Aykroyd) in the film 1941 (1979), and later as a "Walley World" security guard in National Lampoon's Vacation (1983). He further showed his comedic abilities as Jim the clumsy mechanic in the cult classic Used Cars (1980). His last role was Cookie in the Hallmark Channel original films Love's Long Journey and Love's Abiding Joy.

Death
On April 29, 2021, McRae died from a heart attack in Santa Monica, California, at the age of 80.

Selected filmography

References

External links

Frank McRae (Aveleyman)

1941 births
2021 deaths
African-American male actors
American male film actors
American football defensive tackles
American male television actors
Chicago Bears players
Players of American football from Memphis, Tennessee
Tennessee State Tigers football players
Male actors from Memphis, Tennessee
Tennessee State University alumni
20th-century African-American people
21st-century African-American people